Robert Henry Preston (March 15, 1840 - December 18, 1926) was an Ontario doctor and political figure. He represented Leeds South from 1875 to 1879 and from 1883 to 1886 and Leeds from 1886 to 1894 in the Legislative Assembly of Ontario as a Conservative member.

He was born in Bastard Township, Leeds County in 1840, the son of Anthony Preston, a farmer who came to Upper Canada from Ireland. His younger brother Richard Franklin Preston was also a physician and politician. In 1862, he received an M.D. from Ann Arbor Medical College in Michigan; he went on to study at Bellvue College in New York City and Queen's College and received his license to practice medicine in 1864, setting up practice in Newboro. In 1868, he was named associate coroner for the United Counties of Leeds and Grenville. Preston was president of the Brockville, Westport and Sault Ste. Marie Railway. He married Elizabeth, the daughter of Benjamin Tett, in 1868. He served as president of the North Crosby and Newboro Agricultural Association. Preston was also a member of the Freemasons.

External links 
A Cyclopæedia of Canadian biography : being chiefly men of the time, GM Rose (1886)

1840 births
1926 deaths
Progressive Conservative Party of Ontario MPPs
Canadian coroners